Wayne Lordan is a multiple Group race winning Irish jockey.

His first winner was Ethbaat for trainer Gerry Cully at Killarney on 15 July 1998. In his early career he was associated with the stables of David Wachman and Tommy Stack. He also rode occasionally for Eddie Lynam.

It was for Lynam he won his first Group 1 on the unfancied Sole Power in the 2010 Nunthorpe Stakes at York. At 100/1, the horse was the longest priced winner of a British Group 1 for 35 years. Another horse owned by the Power bookmaking family, Slade Power, and also trained by Lynam gave him even greater success, winning three Group 1 sprints over the course of 2013 and 2014 - the British Champions Sprint Stakes, the Diamond Jubilee Stakes and the July Cup.

In January 2017, Lordan was taken on by Aidan O'Brien. This led to his first Classic winner, Winter, who won the 1,000 Guineas on 7 May 2017. Lordan also won the 2017 Matron Stakes at Leopardstown on Hydrangea, a race Lordan also won in September 2015 on Legatissimo.

Statistics

Flat wins in Ireland by year

Flat wins in Great Britain by year

Major wins 
 Ireland
Matron Stakes - (2) - Legatissimo (2015), Hydrangea (2017)
Pretty Polly Stakes - (1) - Iridessa (2019)
Tattersalls Gold Cup - (1) - Magical (2020)
 Great Britain
1000 Guineas Stakes - (2) - Winter (2017), Hermosa (2019)
British Champions Sprint Stakes - (2) - Slade Power (2013), Gordon Lord Byron (2014)
Diamond Jubilee Stakes - Slade Power (2014)
Fillies' Mile - Iridessa (2018)
July Cup - Slade Power (2014)
Nassau Stakes - Legatissimo (2015)
Nunthorpe Stakes - Sole Power (2010)
 United States
Breeders' Cup Filly & Mare Turf - Iridessa (2019)

Notes

References 

Irish jockeys
Living people
Year of birth missing (living people)